The Ghanche District is the easternmost district of the 14 districts of Pakistan-administered territory of Gilgit-Baltistan. Pakistan Army's brigade headquarters is located at Goma, Ghanche district. With its administrative headquarters in the historic city of Khaplu, the Ghanche District is famous as a tourist destination for its outstanding scenery and high altitude landscapes.

Name 
The term Ghanche is a balti/ Tibetan  word ,
The original   word was   'gangs chay' where gangs means ' ice ' and chay means ' big'.
Now gangschay has become ' ghanche' .

Geography

The Ghanche District is bounded on the north-east by the Kashgar Prefecture and the Hotan Prefecture of China's Xinjiang Uyghur Autonomous Region, to the south-east by the Leh District of Indian-administered Ladakh, on the south-west by the Kharmang District, on the west by the Skardu District, and on the north-west by the Shigar District.  The Actual Ground Position Line (AGPL) is located at the easternmost part of the Ghanche District, across the Saltoro Ridge.  Territory east of the AGPL, including the entire Siachen Glacier, is currently controlled by India. It has been proposed by moderates in both India and Pakistan to turn the entire Siachen Glacier area into a "peace park". The area west of the Saltoro Ridge is controlled by Pakistan.

The headquarters of the Ghanche District is the town of Khaplu. The Ghanche District is the coldest place within Pakistan and its administered territories and is referred to as the "third pole", with temperatures reaching below -20 °C in the winter. The Khaplu Valley and the Hushe Valley form the gateway for the great Baltoro Muztagh, the subrange of the Karakoram Mountains that includes the mighty peaks of K2 (8,611 m), Broad Peak (8,047 m), the Gasherbrums (8,000+ m) and Masherbrum (7,821 m),all of which are also included in the Skardu District).

Etymology 
The word "gang" in the Balti language means "glacier", and '"che"  is used as a superlative term to indicate "an abundance". The word is used by the residents of the Khaplu Valley in the name of the Ghanche Nallah, a seasonal stream which flows through the town of Khaplu during the summer season. When the Pakistani government elevated the status of the Ghanche Tehsil to that of a district, the people of the valley willingly selected the name "Ghanche".

Administration 

The Ghanche District is divided into three tehsils: 

 Khaplu Tehsil
 Daghoni Tehsil
 Masherbrum Tehsil

The three tehsils are divided into 56 union councils, with each council containing many villages.  Four villages of the Chorbat Valley were lost in the Indo-Pakistani War of 1971. Those were the villages of Chalunka, Thang, Turtuk, and Tyakshi. . Some of them are given in the chart below.

Religion 

The majority of the people living in the Ghanche District belongs to Noorbakhshi sect, with the rest belonging to the Shia, Sunni, and Wahabi sects. A religious leader locally called a "bowa" has a very important place in Ghanche society.

Tourism 
Ghanche is one of the most visited tourist destination in Pakistan. Famous places to visit in Ghanche are: 
 Haldi Cones View Point
 Thaley Broq
 Daghoni Valley
 Balghar ranga
 Dongsa Rock Kuroo
 Hushe Valley 
 Nangma Valley 
 Chaqchan Mosque 
 Khaplu Fort 
 Thoqsi Khar
 Hot Spring Kondus
 Gyari Yadgar e Shuhada Saltoro

Education 

According to the Alif Ailaan Pakistan District Education Rankings 2017, Ghanche is ranked 29th out of 141 districts in terms of education. For facilities and infrastructure, the district is ranked 118th out of 155.

See also

Districts of Gilgit–Baltistan
Constituency GBLA-24
2012 Gayari Sector avalanche
Noorbakhshia
Saltoro Ridge

References

 
Districts of Gilgit-Baltistan